William Tennent High School is a public high school serving grades 9 through 12, located in Warminster, Pennsylvania, US.

The school is the only public high school serving Warminster and Upper Southampton townships and Ivyland borough in the Centennial School District, located in Bucks County, Pennsylvania.

The school was named in honor of William Tennent, Presbyterian minister and founder of the original Log College, a very early theological school located in the colony of Pennsylvania.  The first William Tennent High School building was located across the street from the current high school and when both were in use, the buildings were called William Tennent Intermediate High School (grades 9 and 10) and William Tennent Senior High School (grades 11 and 12) (the current school). The site of the original Log College is located near the modern high school

Notable alumni
 Brian Baker (Class of 1985) – actor, former Sprint pitchman
 Steve Capus – president of NBC News: 2005-13; currently executive producer of CBS News
 Kermit Cintron (Class of 1999) – champion boxer
 Frank Coonelly (Class of 1978) – President, Pittsburgh Pirates
 Thomas W. Druce (Class of 1979) – former Pennsylvania State Representative
 Len Hatzenbeller (Class of 1977) – professional basketball player
 Bernie O'Neill - former Pennsylvania State Representative
 Josh Ostrander (Class of 1998) – musician
 Mike Pettine – head coach, Cleveland Browns, was a head coach for the school before being terminated
 Mike Vogel (Class of 1998) – actor

Feeder schools

Middle schools
 Log College Middle School
 Eugene Klinger Middle School

Elementary schools
 McDonald Elementary
 Willow Dale Elementary
 Davis Elementary

References

External links

Official school website

Educational institutions established in 1955
Public high schools in Pennsylvania
School buildings completed in 1974
Schools in Bucks County, Pennsylvania
1955 establishments in Pennsylvania